Wole Ojo (born 6 June 1984) is a Nigerian actor. He broke into the Nigerian scene in 2009, after winning the fourth edition of the Amstel Malta Box Office reality show.

Education
He has a bachelor's degree in Creative Arts from University of Lagos.

Filmography

Accolades

See also
 List of Nigerian actors

References

External links

Nigerian male film actors
Living people
1984 births
Yoruba male actors
University of Lagos alumni
Male actors in Yoruba cinema
21st-century Nigerian male actors
Participants in Nigerian reality television series
Nigerian male television actors
20th-century births